Fred Williams was a Negro league catcher in the 1920s.

Williams made his Negro leagues debut in 1921 with the Columbus Buckeyes and the Indianapolis ABCs. He finished his career in 1924 playing for the Washington Potomacs and the Harrisburg Giants.

References

External links
 and Seamheads

Place of birth missing
Place of death missing
Year of birth missing
Year of death missing
Columbus Buckeyes (Negro leagues) players
Harrisburg Giants players
Indianapolis ABCs players
Washington Potomacs players
Baseball catchers